Dražice is a village and municipality in the Rimavská Sobota District of the Banská Bystrica Region of Slovakia.

History
In historical records, the village was first mentioned in 1323 (1323 Peryese, 1393 Peryeze), when it belonged to Blh Castle. It then passed to the Széchy family (16th century) and to Muráň (17th century). From 1938 to 1944 it belonged to Hungary under the First Vienna Award.

Genealogical resources

The records for genealogical research are available at the state archive "Statny Archiv in Banska Bystrica, Slovakia"

 Roman Catholic church records (births/marriages/deaths): 1829-1887 (parish B)
 Lutheran church records (births/marriages/deaths): 1685-1897 (parish B)
 Reformated church records (births/marriages/deaths): 1782-1862 (parish B)

See also
 List of municipalities and towns in Slovakia

External links
https://web.archive.org/web/20071116010355/http://www.statistics.sk/mosmis/eng/run.html
http://www.e-obce.sk/obec/drazice/drazice.html
http://www.tourist-channel.sk/drazice/indexen.php3
http://drazice.co.ua/
Surnames of living people in Drazice

Villages and municipalities in Rimavská Sobota District